The 1973 Bracknell District Council election was the first election to the newly formed Bracknell District Council in England, taking place on 7 June 1973 alongside other local elections as part of the 1973 United Kingdom local elections.  Its predecessor council was Easthampstead Rural District.  For the first time at a local level, the Labour Party gained control.  The party benefitted from a reapportionment of seats for Bracknell town - at Easthampstead Rural District's last election in 1971, 21 of the 44 councillors represented Bracknell wards, but this now changed to 17 of 31.

Ward results

Ascot

Binfield

Bracknell (Great Hollands)

Bracknell (Old Bracknell)

Bullbrook

College Town

Cranbourne

Crowthorne & Easthampstead

Garth

Harmanswater

Little Sandhurst

Priestwood

Sandhurst

St. Marys

Warfield

Wildridings

References

Bracknell
Bracknell Forest Borough Council elections